Be Honest may refer to:

 "Be Honest" (song), a 2019 song by Jorja Smith featuring Burna Boy
 Be Honest (EP), a 2010 EP by melodic hardcore band No Trigger